The 2015–16 New York Islanders season was the 44th season in the franchise's history. This season was the team's first at Barclays Center in Brooklyn, one of the five boroughs of New York City, which it shares with the Brooklyn Nets of the National Basketball Association (NBA).

The team's regular season began on October 9, 2015, against the Chicago Blackhawks.

The Islanders qualified for the 2016 Stanley Cup playoffs after finishing the season in fourth place in the Metropolitan Division and fifth in the Eastern Conference with 100 points. The playoff berth was the team's third post-season berth in four seasons, having qualified in 2012–13 and 2014–15, but not in 2013–14.  The Islanders' first round matchup had them up against the champions of the Atlantic Division, the Florida Panthers. The Islanders won the series in 6 games on a John Tavares goal in double overtime, marking the team's first playoff series victory since 1993.  The Islanders' second round matchup had them matched up against the Tampa Bay Lightning, in which they lost the series in 5 games.

Off-season

Regular season

Standings

Schedule and results

Pre-season

Regular season

Playoffs

Player statistics
Final Stats
Skaters

Goaltenders

†Denotes player spent time with another team before joining the Islanders. Stats reflect time with the Islanders only.
‡Denotes player was traded mid-season. Stats reflect time with the Islanders only.
Bold/italics denotes franchise record.

Notable achievements

Awards

Milestones

Transactions
Following the end of the Islanders' 2014–15 season, and during the 2015–16 season, this team has been involved in the following transactions:

Trades

Free agents acquired

Free agents lost

Claimed via waivers

Lost via waivers

Player signings

Draft picks

Below are the New York Islanders' selections at the 2015 NHL Entry Draft, to be held on June 26–27, 2015 at the BB&T Center in Sunrise, Florida.

Draft notes
 The Pittsburgh Penguins' first-round pick went to the New York Islanders as the result of a trade on June 26, 2015 that sent Griffin Reinhart to Edmonton in exchange for a second-round pick in 2015 (33rd overall) and this pick.
 Edmonton previously acquired this pick as the result of a trade on January 2, 2015 that sent David Perron to Pittsburgh in exchange for Rob Klinkhammer and this pick.
 The New York Islanders' first-round pick will go to the Buffalo Sabres as the result of a trade on October 27, 2013 that sent Thomas Vanek to New York in exchange for Matt Moulson, a second-round pick in 2015 and this pick (being conditional at the time of the trade). The condition – Buffalo will receive a first-round pick in 2014 or 2015 at New York's choice – was converted on May 22, 2014 when the Islanders elected to keep their 2014 first-round pick.
 The New York Islanders' first-round pick went to the Ottawa Senators as the result of a trade on June 26, 2015 that sent Robin Lehner and David Legwand to Buffalo in exchange for this pick.
 Buffalo previously acquired this pick as the result of a trade on October 27, 2013 that sent Thomas Vanek to New York in exchange for Matt Moulson, a second-round pick in 2015 and this pick (being conditional at the time of the trade). The condition – Buffalo will receive a first-round pick in 2014 or 2015 at New York's choice – was converted on May 22, 2014 when the Islanders elected to keep their 2014 first-round pick.
The New York Rangers' first-round pick went to the New York Islanders as the result of a trade on June 26, 2015 that sent Edmonton's second-round pick in 2015 (33rd overall) and Florida's third-round pick in 2015 (72nd overall) to Tampa Bay in exchange for  this pick.
 Tampa Bay previously acquired this pick as the result of trade on March 5, 2014 that sent Martin St. Louis and a conditional second-round pick in 2015 to New York in exchange for Ryan Callahan, a conditional first-round pick in 2014, a conditional seventh-round pick in 2015 and this pick.
 The New York Islanders' fifth-round pick went to the San Jose Sharks as the result of a trade on June 5, 2014 that sent Dan Boyle to New York in exchange for this pick (being conditional at the time of the trade). The condition – San Jose will receive a fifth-round pick in 2015 if Boyle is not re-signed by the Islanders for the 2014–15 NHL season – was converted on July 1, 2014.
 The Montreal Canadiens' fifth-round pick went to the New York Islanders as the result of a trade on June 27, 2015 that sent a fifth-round pick in 2016 to Florida in exchange for this pick.
 Florida previously acquired this pick as the result of a trade on March 4, 2014 that sent Mike Weaver to Montreal in exchange for this pick.

References

New York Islanders seasons
New York Islanders
New York Islanders
New York Islanders
New York Islanders
2010s in Brooklyn
Prospect Heights, Brooklyn